Miguel Ángel Ferriz (29 November 1899 – 1 January 1967) was a Mexican film actor.

Selected filmography
 The Night of the Mayas (1939)
 The Rock of Souls (1942)
 The Eternal Secret (1942)
 The Spectre of the Bride (1943)
 Lady Windermere's Fan (1944)
 Rosalinda (1945)
 The Hour of Truth (1945)
 Nocturne of Love (1948)
 Streetwalker (1951)
 The Martyr of Calvary (1952)
 The Boy and the Fog (1953)
The Sword of Granada (1953)
 Pain (1953)
 The Price of Living (1954)
 Camelia (1954)
 When I Leave (1954)
 The Bandits of Cold River (1956)
 Pablo and Carolina (1957)
The Boxer (1958)
The Life of Agustín Lara (1959)
 My Mother Is Guilty (1960)
 The Fair of the Dove (1963)

References

Bibliography
 Agrasánchez, Rogelio. Guillermo Calles: A Biography of the Actor and Mexican Cinema Pioneer. McFarland, 2010.

External links

1899 births
1967 deaths
Mexican male film actors
Mexican male silent film actors